Michael Aheam (or true surname Ahern) was an American sailor born in County Cork, Ireland. He received the Medal of Honor for valor in action during the American Civil War. There is an Ahern family genealogy that has a Michael Ahern listed, who was born in County Cork about 1834, but there is no reference to any Civil War Union Navy service of any kind.

Aheam was illegally recruited in Queenstown, Ireland in November 1863 along with several others, and officially enlisted in the US Navy from France. He served as a Paymaster's Steward aboard the  during her battle with the commerce raider  on June 19, 1864, off Cherbourg, France. His Medal of Honor citation (dated December 31, 1864) noted that he had been "highly recommended" by his divisional officer after "carrying out his duties courageously" and exhibiting "gallantry under enemy fire" with "marked coolness and good conduct". He was one of seventeen Kearsarge sailors who received the medal for valor during this battle.

Medal of Honor citation
Rank and organization: Paymaster's Steward, U.S. Navy. Enlisted in: France. G.O. No.: 45, December 31, 1864.

Citation:
Served on board the U.S.S. Kearsarge when she destroyed the Alabama off Cherbourg, France, June 19, 1864. Carrying out his duties courageously, PmS. Aheam exhibited marked coolness and good conduct and was highly recommended by his divisional officer for gallantry under enemy fire.

See also

 List of American Civil War Medal of Honor recipients: A–F

References

Year of birth missing
Union Navy sailors
United States Navy Medal of Honor recipients
American Civil War recipients of the Medal of Honor
Irish-born Medal of Honor recipients
1907 deaths
Military personnel from County Cork